Karl Thomas Stenström (born January 19, 1988), is a Swedish artist, singer and songwriter. He is best known for his charting single "Slå mig hårt i ansiktet". He has released three albums: Nåt annat, nån annanstans (2012), Fulkultur (2014) and Rör inte min kompis! (2017).

He grew up in Uddevalla. In 2010 he was awarded the Ted Gärdestad Scholarship and in 2011 released his second single "Detsamma" followed by "Krossade drömmar" and "Full av liv". The debut album Nåt annat, nån annanstans was released on June 13, 2012. In 2014, he took part in Sommarkrysset a Swedish television program broadcast live from the Gröna Lund amusement park in Stockholm during the summer. The same year he released his second album Fulkultur.

Discography

Albums

EPs

Singles

Other charted songs

Notes

References

External links
Official website

1988 births
Swedish pop singers
Swedish-language singers
Living people
21st-century Swedish singers
21st-century Swedish male singers